Nick Pride and the Pimptones are a funk/jazz/soul band based in Newcastle upon Tyne. The Pimptones were formed in 2007 by guitarist, composer and arranger Nick Pride. Their record label Record Kicks describes them as "a deep funk/jazz-dance outfit playing original music in the style of The Meters, JTQ and Charlie Hunter. The group is equally at home in a noisy nightclub or intimate jazz setting, and is most likely to bring the roof of either down with their heavy dancefloor grooves, big breaks and sophisticated jazz numbers"

It's the Pimptones
In the original line-up, Pride was joined by Oscar Cassidy (drums), Ian 'dodge' Paterson (bass), Dave Wilde (sax and flute) and Alex Leathard (trombone). This first incarnation of the band can be heard on the debut release It’s The Pimptones (Jazz Girl Records).

In 2009 the band released the 7" single "Deeper Pimp" on Wack Records, which went on to enjoy extended radioplay across Europe including the Craig Charles Funk and Soul Show on BBC 6 and became the first of the group’s trademark "Live-Band Bootlegs", a unique approach to the Mash-Up genre, and a show stopping live feature. The success of the single helped ensure more live opportunities for the Pimptones and promoters in the North-East drafted the group in to support touring acts such as Maceo Parker, Candi Staton, Youngblood Brass Band and Hot 8 Brass Band.

Midnight Feast of Jazz
The departure of the first horn section and the arrival of the new horn section (Keith Nicholson and Tomas Quilliam) heralded the start of the new line-up for the Pimptones and a new tougher funkier sound. 2011 saw the release of the single "Waitin' So Long" featuring Jess Roberts, and later the album Midnight Feast of Jazz featuring Jess Roberts, Susan Hamilton and Zoe Gilby, both on Milan based label Record Kicks. This album was well received with reviews calling it "a very strong debut by Nick Pride here that you can dance to or just sit back and groove to", "A refreshing blast of energy and musical enthusiasm"
, "There’s so much below-average Funk being made at the moment and so let this be a sharp lesson to all of those bands. This is how it should be done. More please!", and that "these guys are certainly capable of throwing a party in your living room as well as in the town hall of your city".

Re-juiced Phat Shake
The Pimptones third studio album Re-juiced Phat Shake was released on Legere Recordings on Valentine's Day 2014 and featured a host of guest singers creating a much more varied sound from the previous album "Midnight Feast of Jazz". Nick Pride states "I was always a fan of amazing pop songwriters like Burt Bacharach and Holland-Dozier-Holland, but on the other hand, being a dedicated musician, I love the raw energy of being on stage with a funk band". The album was well received by reviews saying "The emphasis is on songwriting backed with energetic, tight funky playing"; "an album filled with soulfully deep and satisfying recordings that are light on filler yet heavy on grooves to keep your body shaking to the beat";"one of the most exciting albums of 2014".

With the departure of sax player Tomas Quilliam to set up his own business  John Waugh was brought on board as the new full-time sax player.

Go Deep
With the sudden departure of John Waugh (sax) to join The 1975 both Alex Saxon (sax) and Beth Macari (vocals) were brought in to re-focus the band towards a more old school funk & soul sound. The result of this is the new album Go Deep recorded live in Newcastle upon Tyne in August 2015 at Loft Studios, and being released on Légère Recordings in June 2016.

Live performances / airplay
The group’s touring schedule has also taken them to many of the UK’s finest funk venues including the 100 Club, The Yardbird in Birmingham, Band on The Wall in Manchester, Hi-Fi Club in Leeds, the Jazzbar in Edinburgh, as well as festivals such as The Mostly Jazz Festival, The North East Funk and Soul Revue and The Sage Gateshead International Jazz Festival.

Internationally they have played at the Imagina Funk Festival (2015), Novara Jazz Festival (2012) and Swingin' Groningen (2012) along with various gigs in Italy and Spain.

In 2011, The Pimptones remix of The Breakbeat Junkie track "Rock The Funky Beat" become a firm favourite of the BBC6 Music Funk and Soul Show, and was one of the most requested songs on RAI Radio 2’s Pop Corner (Italy).

Nick Pride also produces the Pimptones podcast designed to highlight up and coming music from the band and from other artists in the North East.

Band members
The current line-up for Nick Pride and the Pimptones is as follows:
 Nick Pride - guitar, vocals, songwriter
 Pete Lawson - drums
 Jimmy Brown - electric bass
 Keith Nicholson - trumpet / flugel
 Alex Saxon - saxophone / flute 
 Eliza Lawson - vocals

The Pimptones have collaborated with:
 Oscar Cassidy - drums, percussion
 Ian Paterson - bass guitar
 Chris Hibbard - trombone
 Dave Wilde - saxophone, flute
 Alex Leathard - trombone
 Graham Hardy - trumpet, flugel horn
 John Wheeler - saxophone
 James Peacock - keyboard
 Paul Edis - piano
 Paul Loraine - keyboard
 Laurie Shepherd - guest vocals
 Zoe Gilby - guest vocals
 Jess Roberts - guest vocals
 Susan Hamilton - guest vocals
 Adam Sinclair - drums
 Tom Quilliam - saxophone
 John Waugh - saxophone
 Lyndon Anderson - guest vocals / harmonica
 Renegade Brass Band
 Karen Harding - guest vocals
 Dubbul O - guest vocals
 Courtney Valencia - guest vocals
 Thomas Lane Hewitt - guest vocals
 Beth Macari - lead vocals
 Sue Ferris - tenor sax, baritone sax
 Micky Moran Parker - guest vocals
 Renegade Brass Band - brass, vocals, percussion

Discography 
Albums
 It's The Pimptones!!!!!!! (2009 - Jazz Girl Records)
 Midnight Feast of Jazz (2011 - Record Kicks) 
 Remixed Feast of Jazz (2012 - Record Kicks)
 Rejuiced Phat Shake (2014 - Légère Recordings)
 Old School Studios Live Session (Unofficial FREE D/L 2015)
 The Bootleg Project (Unofficial FREE D/L 2015)
 Go Deep (2016 - Légère Recordings)

Singles
 "Deeper Pimp" (2009 - Wack Records)
 "Lay It On The Line" (2011 - Record Kicks)
 "Waitin’ So Long" feat Jess Roberts (2011 - Record Kicks)
 "Unfinished Sympathy" 7" (2012 - Badass 45s)
 "Take Care of My Love" (2013 - Légère Recordings ) 
 "Shimmy" / "Honey" 7" (2013 - Badass 45s)
 "Why Does My Man" (2015 - Légère Recordings)
 "Gotta Leave The Lady Alone" / "Baby Can We Start Again" (2016 - Légère Recordings)

Compilations
 Smoove Presents Mo' Record Kicks (2011 - Record Kicks)
 VA Record Kicks 10 Compilation (2013 - Record Kicks)
 Craig Charles Funk And Soul Classics (2015 - Sony Music TV Comp)

References

External links
 Bandcamp site
 Label website
 Nick Pride and the Pimptones on Myspace
 Nick Pride and the Pimptones on Facebook

English funk musical groups
Musical groups from Newcastle upon Tyne
2007 establishments in England